Bellum, Latin for "war", may refer to:

War 
 Bellum/Polemos, the daemon of war from Greco-Roman mythology
 Bellum omnium contra omnes, a Latin phrase meaning "the war of all against all"
 Bellum se ipsum alet, a Latin phrase meaning "the war will feed itself"
 Bellum civile (disambiguation), a Latin phrase meaning "civil war"

Places 
 Bellum Valley, Oates Land, Antarctica

See also 

 
 
 Belum
 Belum Caves
 BELAM
 Bellem, town in Belgium
 Interbellum
 Antebellum (disambiguation)
 Parabellum (disambiguation)
 Postbellum (disambiguation)